Sodam Yat is a fictional character, an extraterrestrial superhero published by DC Comics. He first appeared in Tales of the Green Lantern Corps Annual #2 (1986), and was created by Alan Moore and Kevin O'Neill. He operated as Ion, having become one of the most powerful characters in current continuity. In 2013, ComicsAlliance ranked Sodam Yat as #32 on their list of the "50 Sexiest Male Characters in Comics".

Fictional character biography

Introduction
Sodam Yat is a prophesied future member of the Green Lantern Corps, created by Alan Moore and is first mentioned in "Tygers", a story in Tales of the Green Lantern Corps Annual #2. He is mentioned in passing to Abin Sur by a demon named Qull of the Five Inversions, who had been imprisoned on the planet Ysmault by the Guardians of the Universe. As a Daxamite (a race which descended from Kryptonians with inherent Superman-like powers) with a power ring, he would be nearly unstoppable. Despite this, in Qull's prophecy, he is still defeated as part of the final destruction of the Green Lantern Corps.

Alan Moore planned to use the character in his proposed story, "Twilight of the Superheroes", which went unpublished. In the proposal that was leaked onto the Internet, the Daxamite Green Lantern is named "Sodal Yat" and is also referred to as "The Ultimate Green Lantern". In that story, Sodal Yat is the last of an army of aliens to attack Superman. The Man of Steel defeats many Green Lanterns, Thanagarians, and the Martian Manhunter before finally being killed by Sodam Yat. The character would subsequently go unused until 2006.

Modern incarnation
As a young boy, Sodam Yat wants nothing more than to explore the stars, but the xenophobic Daxam society forbids it. When a spacecraft crashes on Daxam, Sodam rescues the pilot. The pilot, named Tessog, and Sodam become friends despite not speaking the same language. His parents discover Tessog and kill him, and then brainwash Sodam into thinking his friend was a violent menace. Years later, while on a school field trip to a museum, Sodam freezes at the sight of an anti-alien diorama featuring Tessog's stuffed and preserved body attacking a Daxamite. This discovery causes Sodam's true memories to resurface. Enraged and disgusted by what had happened, Sodam rebuilds Tessog's ship, planning to leave Daxam forever. On the night of his departure, a power ring comes to him, telling he has the ability to overcome great fear, and Sodam becomes a member of the Green Lantern Corps.

Sodam Yat makes his first appearance in regular DC continuity in Green Lantern Corps #12 and part three of the Sinestro Corps War (Green Lantern Corps #14) when Kilowog gathers a group of Lanterns to strike back against Sinestro's forces attack in Space Sector 2263. Salaak singles out Arisia to keep an eye on the newly graduated Lantern Yat, though she wonders why Yat is so important. Salaak has been charged by the Guardians of the Universe to keep Qull's prophecy from coming to pass but keeps this to himself, only saying that one day she may know why he is so special. In Green Lantern Corps #16 he destroys the core of Ranx the Sentient City, ending the battle of Mogo.

In Green Lantern Corps #17 Yat is chosen as the new host for the Ion entity by the Guardians of the Universe and fights Superboy-Prime. The two battle each other fiercely through different areas of New York. Under the yellow light of the sun, Ion begins to unleash Superman-like powers, such as heat vision, to hurt his opponent. While the two trade blows, Ion is thrown into a nuclear power plant. The lead lining the walls causes Ion to weaken. Prime takes the opportunity to spear him with several uranium rods, severely injuring him. Ion tries to escape, only to have Prime knock him into a cemetery. They continue to do battle, each drawing blood from their opponent. Although Ion battles courageously, the lead poisoning and loss of blood begins to affect him and he is beaten unconscious. He is later seen receiving medical attention from Soranik Natu.

After the events of the war, the Guardians request Kyle Rayner assist Yat in adjusting to his new role. While speaking about Yat's history and attitude as a Lantern, it is revealed that he must now permanently wear a power ring (despite his possession of the Ion powers) to prevent the lead in his body from killing him. They are then attacked by Alexander Nero who had been freed during the initial assault on Oa, but had not participated in the overall Sinestro Corps story. Rayner fights to less than his abilities to encourage Yat to embrace his status as Ion. Yat eventually defeats Nero by taking control of Nero's own constructs, something Rayner states that he had never attempted.

Some time later, Yat and Arisia receive word of the Sinestro Corps' invasion of Daxam from Yat's mother, who had escaped using the ship that her son was going to use to escape Daxam. She is shocked when Yat refuses to return to Daxam. Instead, he lashes out at her, citing to Arisia his reasons for leaving his home planet. He even goes so far as to say that the Daxamites brought the invasion on themselves and that they are paying for their sins. Finally, he agrees to return on the condition that his mother, out loud, thank Tessog for providing her with a means of escape. After sending his mother to Oa, Yat and Arisia set out for Daxam. When Arisia asks him why he agreed to return, Yat states that his oath as a Green Lantern supersedes his hatred of Daxam and its people. Yat and Arisia arrive at Daxam after getting past the enormous snake-like Sinestro Corps member encircling the planet. Once on the surface, they find Yat's father who is promoting mass suicide as an alternative to living as Sinestro Corps slaves. The two Green Lanterns are able to save some, but not all, of his followers. Outraged, Yat declares that they will fight the Sinestro Corps. With the riot on Oa keeping any Green Lantern reinforcements from coming anytime soon, Yat takes on Mongul, the Sinestro Corps' new leader, head on, requesting that his ring grant him access to the Ion power. The ring refuses, stating that a Guardian (specifically Scar) is blocking his access to the Ion power and the only way to get past the block would be to remove his ring, which would kill him due to the enormous amounts of lead in his system from the battle with Superboy-Prime. His ring goes on to say that a massive power jolt could grant him limited access to the Ion power. With that, Yat drops his shields and takes the full power of Mongul's blast directly. The power jolt works and Yat rockets into the sky armed with 95% of the Ion power. As he heads for Daxam's sun, he removes his ring and tells Arisia to keep them fighting. Yat then plunges himself into the sun and uses the Ion power to turn Daxam's red sun into a yellow sun, giving the Daxamites a power boost to ward off Mongul and his Sinestro Corps.

Sodam Yat is at first implied, then confirmed, as alive inside the sun of Daxam, unresponsive and constantly self-immolating, kept alive by Ion's power. The cloaked mastermind behind the Brightest Day, searching to trap and capture the whole emotional spectrum beings, exorcises Ion from Sodam, berating him for his sacrifice and his fellow Daxamites for their xenophobic view. As a result, a now restored Sodam Yat crashes on Daxam, still alive, but unconscious, several Daxamites die because of their sudden depowerment, as their sun turns red again.

The still unconscious Sodam's body is carried away by two boys and hidden from the other Daxamites. Sodam awakens in a cavern, surrounded by many Daxamites who revere him for his sacrifice. They reveal to him that his father and the rest of Daxam society wish to find him and throw him back into the sun so they can get their powers back. Convinced that his survival was due to divine intervention, Sodam declares that, before Daxam can be cleansed of its xenophobia, the rest of the universe must be made a better place. He leads his followers on a journey to "make the Guardians pay for their sins". While on this pilgrimage, Sodam is ambushed by the telepathic warlord Zardor, who later makes him attack Guy Gardner by having him believe Guy is a Guardian. However, when Arisia and Kilowog were able to break Zardor's control over Sodam, he fled using Sodam as his personal body guard. Zardor's last words for the corps were: "Enjoy the war".

The New 52
Sodam Yat has since been reintroduced into the New 52 during the Green Lantern crossover Uprising. While his actions under Zardor's control are currently unknown, he was at some point captured by the Durlans. The Durlans kept him on the planet Corona Seven, of Space Sector 700 where they were able to remove his ring and broke Zardor's control over him. They also experimented on him in an attempt to learn how to mimic his form all the while interrogated him about his home planet of Daxam. After being release from his prison by the Green Lantern Corps, Sodam revealed to them that he had wondered if they all had forgotten about him. Arisia Rhab was overjoyed to see him alive.

DC Rebirth
Sodam Yat returns as a Green Lantern (sporting his Ion costume) in the final issue of Green Lanterns. He is one of the Green Lanterns who arrive on Earth to help Hal Jordan fight Cyborg Superman. When Cyborg Superman claims that no one can stop him because he has the powers of Superman, Sodam Yat refutes this by sending Henshaw crashing into a car with a single blow and blasting him with heat vision.  Sodam Yat claims that as a Daxamite, he is Superman's equal and is one that can stop Cyborg Superman.

Powers and abilities

Daxamite powers
Like their Kryptonian cousins, the Daxamites gain a large number of abilities when exposed to yellow sunlight including super strength; flight; super speed; super hearing; X-ray, heat, microscopic, and telescopic vision; and super breath.  While the Daxamites are invulnerable while under yellow sunlight, the substance lead is still very lethal to them even in small quantities, as Kryptonite is to Kryptonians. Due to his exposure to lead from lead shielding at a nuclear power plant and uranium stabbed into him by Superboy-Prime, Yat must wear his Green Lantern ring at all times to stop the lead poisoning or he will die within a few minutes.

Ion powers
The benevolent Ion entity bestows its host with powers similar to a Green Lantern Corps Power Ring and the Starheart. With those powers, Sodam Yat has been described by some as the most powerful superhero in the universe. However, access to the powers can be controlled through his power ring, which he is required to wear constantly, allowing the Guardians of the Universe to shut off his Ion powers. In the Legion of Three Worlds miniseries, it is revealed that being host to the Ion entity has allowed Sodam to survive, unaging, into the 31st century.

Other versions

Legion of 3 Worlds
In the future shown in the Legion of 3 Worlds miniseries, Sodam Yat is revealed as still alive, having been kept ageless by the Ion power, and residing in the ruined and lifeless husk that once was Oa, a rotten graveyard in which the dead Lanterns and their rings, unable to reach the new recruits since Mogo's destruction, come to rest. After the death of the last of the Green Lantern, Rond Vidar, Mon-El and Shadow Lass travel to Oa where they find Sodam Yat still alive and ask for his help. He states his unwillingness to act due to his unspecified past failures and spiritual unworthiness—possibly foreshadowing his actions in leading his people in war on the universe—along with his role as the last Guardian of the Universe. However, Mon-El is able to convince Yat to take up the fight against his old foe, Superboy-Prime, and the Legion of Super-Villains. Yat draws in all the power left in Oa's central power battery, absorbs the fallen rings (placing some on his fingers), and uses a modified oath.

Yat aids the Legions in fighting Prime, realizing that the universe still needs a defense against this sort of evil. After the battle is finished, Yat retreats to Oa and begins to send rings across the universe to begin a new Green Lantern Corps.

References

Characters created by Alan Moore
Comics characters introduced in 1986
Fictional avatars
DC Comics aliens
DC Comics characters who can move at superhuman speeds
DC Comics characters with superhuman strength
DC Comics characters with accelerated healing
Green Lantern Corps officers